Salem Ilese, also known as Salem Davern, is an American singer and songwriter.

Early life 
Ilese was born in Mill Valley, California. Her songwriting career started at the age of 10 when she began classes with Bonnie Hayes (songwriter for Bonnie Raitt and Cher) in San Francisco. She also attended Berklee College of Music.

Career 
Her single, "Mad at Disney", was awarded gold by the RIAA. The song peaked at number 67 on the Billboard Global 200 in 2020, and appeared on the Rolling Stone Top 100 Popular Songs in 2020. Additionally, Ilese co-wrote Jamie Miller's "Here's Your Perfect", Bella Poarch's "Build a Bitch," Tomorrow X Together's "Anti-Romantic". Her EP "(L)only Child" was released with a food truck in May 2021.

Her other song, "Crypto Boy", rose in popularity in social media including YouTube Shorts and TikTok.

Songwriting credits

References 

American women singer-songwriters
21st-century American women singers
21st-century American singers
1999 births
Living people
People from Mill Valley, California
Berklee College of Music alumni